Sarah Sadler is an American Contemporary Christian singer-songwriter and author. She has released two full-length albums, appeared on numerous compilation projects and is the author of Southern Solstice. The first album is her self-titled debut which was released in 2002 on Essential Records.  Songs from her self-titled debut have been featured in TV and Film worldwide.  "Beautiful," the first single from Sarah Sadler proved to be commercially successful and has been featured in numerous TV and Film projects as well as winning a Nielsen "Scan Award" for 30,000+ spins on CHR Radio. She released her second album called Where It Started on Audioluxe Records in 2008.

Discography
Sarah Sadler (2002)
Where It Started (2008)

References

http://www.newreleasetuesday.com/artistdetail.php?artist_id=1507

Year of birth missing (living people)
Living people
People from Nashville, Tennessee
Singer-songwriters from Tennessee